Ammon Ford is an unincorporated community northeast of Ammon, in Bladen County, North Carolina, United States. The town has a population of 338 as of the 2010 United States Census.

References

Unincorporated communities in Bladen County, North Carolina
Unincorporated communities in North Carolina